Dmitri Yevgenyevich Torbinski (born 28 April 1984) is a Russian former professional footballer who played as a midfielder. He was a central midfielder and winger known for his pace and accurate crosses.

Club career
Torbinski began his career as a futsal player, but has then moved into football and joined the Spartak's youth academy at a young age. He toiled for several years in the reserve team before making his first team debut in 2002. He continued his career as a part-time player in the squad in 2003, but was limited by a serious injury in 2004, making only one appearance.

In 2005, Dmitri was decided to play for Spartak Chelyabinsk in order to get regular playing time and has then returned to Spartak Moscow. Torbinski left the club on a free transfer at the end of 2007 season going to Lokomotiv Moscow.

In July 2014, Torbinski joined FC Rostov.

On 14 December 2017, Torbinski signed a contract with the Cypriot club Pafos FC. After just three games for the club, he returned to Russia, signing with FC Baltika Kaliningrad in February 2018.

On 30 August 2018, he returned to the top-tier Russian Premier League, signing a one-year contract with FC Yenisey Krasnoyarsk. Since 02/25/2020, Torbinski is a Miami United F.C (USA, Florida) under 21 coach.

International career
 Torbinski made his debut in the Russian national team on 24 March 2007 in a game against Estonia and was called up to play for Russia in UEFA Euro 2008.

Torbinski came on as a substitute in the quarter-finals in a match against the Netherlands and scored a goal in extra-time to put Russia 2–1 ahead. Russia eventually won 3–1 advancing to the semi-finals.

He has not been called up for the national team from 2012 to 2014, returning to the squad on 27 March 2015 in an UEFA Euro 2016 qualifier against Montenegro. The game was abandoned with the score of 0–0 due to undisciplined behavior of the Montenegrin fans. He was included in the UEFA Euro 2016 squad, but did not play in any game at the tournament.

International goals
Scores and results list Russia's goal tally first.

Honors

International
Russia
 UEFA European Championship bronze medalist: 2008

Career statistics

Notes

References

1984 births
Living people
People from Norilsk
Russian footballers
Russia under-21 international footballers
Russia international footballers
Association football midfielders
FC Spartak Moscow players
FC Lokomotiv Moscow players
FC Rubin Kazan players
FC Rostov players
FC Krasnodar players
Pafos FC players
FC Baltika Kaliningrad players
FC Yenisey Krasnoyarsk players
Russian expatriate footballers
Expatriate footballers in Cyprus
UEFA Euro 2008 players
UEFA Euro 2016 players
Russian Premier League players
Cypriot First Division players
Russian football managers
Russian expatriate football managers
FC Spartak Nizhny Novgorod players
Sportspeople from Krasnoyarsk Krai